Barrine is a rural locality in the Tablelands Region, Queensland, Australia.

History 
Boar Pocket State School opened in 1909.  In 1912 it was renamed Barrine State School. It closed in 1958.

References 

Tablelands Region
Localities in Queensland